KOE, formally known as the Krewe of Elvis, is a Mardi Gras parading organization that consists of members from around the world who meet in New Orleans for Mardi Gras.

History
1998 saw the birth of Mardi Gras' first Cyber Krewe, KOE and its members are from all over the world. Two Internet "netheads" (Craig Imboden and Chip Curley) founded it and it is made up of fellow Internet junkies devoted to Mardi Gras. KOE is a non-profit club that parades throughout the French Quarter on Fat Tuesday.  There are a number of costumed marching krewes that parade through the Quarter and surrounding areas each Mardi Gras, but KOE was the first organized over the internet consisting mostly  of out-of-towners who enjoyed New Orleans Mardi Gras.

KOE members regularly gather on their members page for posts and cyber chats to stay in touch throughout the year. Memberships are open to the public and currently over 150 strong.

KOE's first Lundi Gras party was held in 1999 and it remains as the official beginning of each year's KOE's Mardi Gras. The annual KOE Lundi Gras party is held Monday, the day before Fat Tuesday.  Members gather at G.W. Fins restaurant to renew friendships, greet new members and trade special throws.

In 2015 the KOE began another annual tradition by hosting a members-only balcony party on the Friday Night before Mardi Gras at the Tropical Isle Bar on Bourbon Street

Throws

The KOE is known for their unique throws. Krewe members bring along beads, doubloons and trinkets to throw or hand out to the Mardi Gras crowds.  Beads are always a popular throw and can be purchased at many Internet sites.  Special KOE themed throws are items which Krewe members bring that support the theme that is chosen for each year's parade.  In addition to the themed items, many members spend the year creating  special throws which are shared with each other at the Lundi Gras party. The crowds love beads and throws and the members have fun giving them away.

KOE Theme Medallions were first created in 2004 with the Pink Cadillac. The Show Girl followed in 2005. In 2006 the KOE Pops the Big Top was a prized catch and the 2007 throw of "KOE Shakes its Booty on the 7 Seas" The 2008 theme "The West Is History" celebrated the KOE's 10th Anniversary and for the first time the parade was led by a New Orleans Jazz Marching Band.  The 2009 theme was "KOE Fables and Fairytales" The KOE celebrated MG with a "HOLIDAZE" theme in 2010.In 2011 the KOE Flew high and celebrated Mardi Gras with its theme "KOE is Spaced Out" - all sorts of interesting space themed costumes were worn. 2012 the KOE  marched to the theme of "Its a Jungle out there" In 2013 the KOE paraded through the streets of the French quarter with their "Barnyard Bash".  In 2014, several Kings and Queens were spotted as they took on the day with the theme of "A Knight in Camelot". For their 2015 parade they channeled the Beatles theme with "Come Together". In 2016 the krewe took a wild ride down a rabbit hole with the theme "KOE in Wonderland". 2017 saw them road trip to Oz with "KOE Off To See The Wizard". 2018.....it is the KOE 20th anniversary as they commemorate this event with a throw back to an Elvis theme.  Look for many Elvi parading throughout the French Quarter on Fat Tuesday.

Parading

On Mardi Gras Day, the parade starts with the Krewe gathering in front of St. Louis Cathedral in Jackson Square.  The members follow a route through the French Quarter that takes them to predestined "Libation Stations" along the route.  Costumes bring out the creativeness of KOE members. Each member dresses according to the theme of that year.

Details for this upcoming year (2023) will be announced shortly.  Previous years saw the KOE marching parade embark on Fat Tuesday through the French Quarter on a predetermined route accompanied by the Treme Brass Band. As the members proceed throughout the streets, many revelers lined up to catch a glimpse of the outlandish costumed members hoping to catch a prized throw.  Along the way they stop for TV/newspaper crews and for fans to snap photos.

As soon as the Mardi Gras is over the Captain and lieutenants begin work on the next year's theme and activities.

Timeline of the KOE

 1998 "Krewe of Elvis" KOE was founded by Craig Imboden and Chip Curley.
 1999 "Krewe of Elvis" KOE celebrates its 1st Lundi Gras Party and Parade during Carnival.
 2000 "Krewe of Elvis" KOE celebrates the Y2k.  Famous trading "throws" become part of the tradition at Lundi Gras Party.
 2002 "Krewe of Elvis" KOE changes its theme to "American trilogy" after the bombing off the Trade Centers in New York. Most participants sport red, white and blue costumes.
 2003 "Krewe of Elvis" KOE unveils its first ever mass-produced medallion beads for their parade.
 2004 "Krewe of Elvis" KOE  officially changes its name to KOE.  Founder Chip Curley resigns from the Krewe. Craig Imboden restructures the Krewe with officers to be more like true Krewes.
 2005 KOE begins a new era with non Elvis-related themes with "Mardi Gras in New Orleans" blazing the way for new costuming.
 2010 KOE celebrates its 10th anniversary as a Krewe. 
 2011 KOE begins to parade with Police escorts and proceeded by the Treme Brass Band.
 2014 KOE Captain Craig Imboden and Maureen Pimley become co-captains of the KOE.
 2016 KOE begins to hold Friday evening Balcony party for their members.
 2017 KOE Co-Captain Craig Imboden resigns from his position. Maureen Pimley is joined by Sandra Briggs as co-Captain.
 2018 KOE celebrates its 20th year in New Orleans.
 2020 KOE welcomes a new Captain, the mysterious Al Rider.
 2023 KOE will celebrate its 25th year with a special throwback theme.

External links
  Official website

Mardi Gras in New Orleans